Matta is an administrative subdivision (Tehsil) of Swat District in the Khyber Pakhtunkhwa province of Pakistan.

District Swat has 7 Tehsils i.e. Tehsil Matta, Tehsil Babuzai, Tehsil Khwaza Khela, Tehsil Barikot,  Tehsil Kabal, Tehsil Charbagh and Tehsil Bahrain. Each Tehsil comprises certain numbers of Union council. There are 65 Union council in district Swat, 56 rural and 09 urban.

According to Khyber Pakhtunkhwa Local Government Act 2013. Tehsil Matta have the following 13 Wards:

 Pir Kalay
 Arcourt
 Tiower
 Bar Tharna
 Gwalarai
 Beha
 Churprial
 Matta Khararai
 Baidara
 Durushkhela
 Asharai
 Darmai
 Sakhra
 Sherpalum (Tigerplace)

Bakoor

Matta, Swat
Swat District

References

External links
Khyber-Pakhtunkhwa Government website section on Lower Dir and neighboring places
United Nations
Hajj 2014 Uploads
 PBS paiman.jsi.com

Swat District
Tehsils of Swat District
Populated places in Swat District